CCMC is a Canadian free improvisation group founded in 1974.

History
The CCMC was founded by Peter Anson, Graham Coughtry, Larry Dubin, Greg Gallagher, Nobuo Kubota, Allan Mattes, Casey Sokol, Bill Smith and Michael Snow. Three of the founding members (Graham Coughtry, Nobuo Kubota, and  Michael Snow) were members of Artists' Jazz Band, a seminal Toronto free-jazz ensemble. In 1976, the group founded The Music Gallery as an artist-run centre  where they performed twice-weekly. The group was formally associated with The Music Gallery until 2000. Members of the group were also founders of the Music Gallery Editions record label, which issued CCMC's first six albums.

The group remains active to the present day, though through its various incarnations Michael Snow has been the group's only constant member. The group currently performs as a quartet of Snow (piano/Octave Cat synthesizer), John Oswald (alto sax), Paul Dutton (soundsinging, mouth harp) and John Kamevaar (electronic percussion/electroacoustic sounds).

Musical style
CCMC's music is based on "improvisation-as-composition" (p. 40)  inspired by free jazz.  

With no pre-existing compositions, live performance is central to the band's identity, and their early recordings were all recorded live in concert. ("Interviewer: Since the very beginning CCMC has recorded every concert, is that true? Michael Snow: Yes, that's, whatever it is, thirteen years of at least twice a week, plus all the tours. A lot of tape, yes."

Name 
The abbreviation CCMC originally stood for Canadian Creative Music Collective. By 1978, and the release of the Volume Three LP, the group had collectively gathered several hundred alternate associations, many of which were reproduced as the cover art of that record. Following are a selection of the names found there:
 Craven Cowards Muttering Curses
 Cries Crashes Murmurs Clanks
 Careless Choir Muffling Chords
 Completely Canadian Monster Circus
 Certified Careless Mush Concept
 Clip Clop Manure Crop
 Catchy Canuck Melody Convinces

Discography 
Volume 1 (Music Gallery Editions – CCMC-1002, 1976)
 Volume 2 (Music Gallery Editions – CCMC-1004, MGE-2, 1976) 
 Volume Three (Music Gallery Editions – MGE 6, 1978)
  Volume 4 - Free Soap (Music Gallery Editions – MGE 22, 1979)
  Larry Dubin & CCMC The Great Toronto Drummer's Greatest Recordings (Music Gallery Editions – MGE 15, 1979)
 Volume 5 - Without A Song (Music Gallery Editions – MGE 31, 1981)
 CCMC '90 (Music Gallery Editions – MGE 90, 1990)
 Decisive Moments: Hot Real-Time Electro-Acoustic Collective Composition (Track & Light Recordings – TLR 02, 1994)
  aCCoMpliCes (Les Disques Victo – VICTO cd063, 1998)
  CCMC & Christian Marclay CCMC + Christian Marclay (Art Metropole/Non Musica Rex – ART MET CD004/NMRX 0003,	2002)
 CCMC Play At Double Double (Free Market Records, FMR07, 2011)

References

Further resources 
 "CCMC". Polyphasic Recordings
 Freedman, Harry (1978). "CCMC VOL. III" in Musicworks, No. 1.
 Discogs listing
 See the Music Gallery archival collection. York University. "The fonds consists of two series, the CCMC concert series (1973-199-?) of twice-weekly public performances by members who have included Peter Anson, Paul Dutton, John Kamevaar, Nobuo Kubotu, Allen Mattes, John Oswald, Michael Snow, Casey Sokol, Jack Vorvis."

Free improvisation ensembles
Free jazz
Canadian jazz ensembles